Colegio Lacordaire is a school in Cali, Colombia that was established in 1956 by the Dominicans. It currently has offerings from infancy through grade eleven, with special emphasis on English language to prepare students to study abroad.

History
On March 18, 2016, the University of Cambridge accredited Lacordaire to grant certification for proficiency levels in English. The school also has agreements whereby its eleventh grade students may receive credits in colleges and universities abroad.

References  

Dominican schools
Educational institutions established in 1956
Schools in Cali
Education in Colombia
1956 establishments in Colombia